Pyramidula cephalonica is a species of air-breathing land snail, a terrestrial pulmonate gastropod mollusk in the family Pyramidulidae.

Shell description 
The width of the shell is up to 2.6 mm, the height is up to 1.8 mm.

Distribution 
This species occurs in countries and islands including:
 Croatia: Dalmatia
 Greece
 Turkey

References

Pyramidulidae
Gastropods described in 1898